The 2020–21 RIT Tigers men's ice hockey season was the 57th season of play for the program, the 16th at the Division I level, and the 15th season in the Atlantic Hockey conference. The Tigers represented the Rochester Institute of Technology and were coached by Wayne Wilson, in his 22nd season.

Season
As a result of the ongoing COVID-19 pandemic the entire college ice hockey season was delayed. Because the NCAA had previously announced that all winter sports athletes would retain whatever eligibility they possessed through at least the following year, none of RIT's players would lose a season of play. However, the NCAA also approved a change in its transfer regulations that would allow players to transfer and play immediately rather than having to sit out a season, as the rules previously required.

Throughout the entire season, RIT was a Jekyll and Hyde team, playing far better at home than they did on the road. Despite having no home fans for the entire season, as a result of COVID protocols, RIT won 7 of their 9 home games, including a sweep of then-ranked Robert Morris. Once the team hit the road the offense quieted down and the defense turned into a sieve. Their only two road wins came early in the season, both against a lowly Niagara team, and the resulting imbalance in play caused the Tigers to hover around the .500 mark for most of the season. RIT finished 5th in the conference and caused the team to travel for their quarterfinal meeting with Canisius. The result was nearly predictable and the Tigers were outscored 4–11 in the two games, ending their abbreviated season.

Daniel Chenard sat out the season.

Departures

Recruiting

Roster
As of September 15, 2020.

Standings

Schedule and Results

|-
!colspan=12 style=";" | Regular Season

|-
!colspan=12 style=";" | 

|- align="center" bgcolor="#e0e0e0"
|colspan=12|RIT Lost Series 0–2

Scoring Statistics

Goaltending statistics

Rankings

USCHO did not release a poll in week 20.

Awards and honors

References

RIT Tigers men's ice hockey seasons
RIT Tigers
RIT Tigers
RIT Tigers
2021 in sports in New York (state)
2020 in sports in New York (state)